Mohammad-Ali Amani is an Iranian conservative politician. He is the deputy secretary-general of the Islamic Coalition Party since 2012.

Amani was Mostafa Mir-Salim's campaign manager during 2017 Iranian presidential election.

References

Living people
Islamic Coalition Party politicians
Iranian wardens
Year of birth missing (living people)
Iranian campaign managers